First National Bank, also known as Carolina First Bank, is a historic bank building located at Greenville, South Carolina. Designed by architect Silas L. Trowbridge of Atlanta, Georgia, it was built in 1938, and is a 2 1/2-story, sandstone sheathed steel frame Art Deco building. The building was enlarged in 1952.  The building features a polished black granite door frame and base, a geometric-patterned cornice and a frieze band, stylized sunburst aluminum grill work, and fluted aluminum pilasters topped with stylized aluminum eagles.

It was added to the National Register of Historic Places in 1989. It currently houses a branch of TD Bank, N.A., which merged with Carolina First Bank in 2010.

References

Bank buildings on the National Register of Historic Places in South Carolina
Art Deco architecture in South Carolina
Commercial buildings completed in 1938
National Register of Historic Places in Greenville, South Carolina